Observations in Time is the 1969 debut album recorded by the Ohio Players and released on the Capitol label. The album was a regional hit in and around the group's home city of Dayton, Ohio. David Bowie included "Here Today and Gone Tomorrow" into his 1974 live sets for the Philadelphia dates of the Year of the Diamond Dogs tour that resulted in the David Live album.

Track listing
All tracks composed by Clarence Satchell, Gregory "Greg" Webster, Leroy "Sugarfoot" Bonner, Ralph "Pee Wee" Middlebrooks, Robert "Kuumba" Jones and Theodore Robinson; except where indicated
"Here Today and Gone Tomorrow" – 3:32
"Mother-in-Law" (Allen Toussaint) – 3:06
"Stop Lying to Yourself" – 2:18
"Over the Rainbow" (E.Y. Harburg, Harold Arlen) – 4:20
"Find Someone to Love" – 2:16
"Cold, Cold World" – 3:49
"Summertime" (DuBose Heyward, George Gershwin) – 7:47
"Bad Bargain" – 2:36
"The Man I Am" – 2:31
"Lonely Street" – 2:29
"Street Party" – 2:23

Personnel
The Ohio Players – main performer
Johnny Brantley – producer
Bill Shannon – liner notes

References

External links
 Observations in Time at Discogs

1969 debut albums
Capitol Records albums
Ohio Players albums